Prussian virtues are the virtues associated with the historical Kingdom of Prussia (1701–1918). They were derived from Prussia's militarism and the ethical code of the Prussian Army as well as from bourgeois values such as honesty and frugality that were influenced by Pietism and the Enlightenment. The so-called "German virtues" that include punctuality, order and diligence can also be traced back to Prussian virtues.

History 

Pietism, which emphasized individual piety and leading an active Christian life, exerted a significant influence on the Prussian court and its nobility from the time of its founding in the late seventeenth century. Although King Frederick William I (r. 1713–1740) was a Calvinist, he had considerable respect for Lutheran-based Pietism. He felt that it had a moderating influence on the tensions between Lutherans and Calvinists within both the kingdom and the court. It also brought with it practical social benefits such as the Francke Foundation, which opened charity schools and orphanages. Pietism quickly became closely intertwined with Prussian governmental bodies at all levels and among all estates. Numerous pastors and administrators educated in the spirit of Pietism at the University of Halle carried its values out into the country. It was also embraced by some of Prussia's high-ranking military officers such as Field Marshal Dubislav Gneomar von Natzmer who championed Pietist attempts to free the army of vices such as gambling and the use of brothels. 
At that time, Prussian territory was spread over wide areas, some of them far apart, and its population was heterogeneous. The majority of Prussians were Lutherans, a minority (including parts of the ruling family) Calvinists, and another minority Catholics. After King Frederick the Great (r. 1740–1786) brought Jews into the country, a total of four larger religious communities existed in the state, along with several smaller free churches. Ethnically, in addition to the German majority, there were Slavic (Polish, Sorbian and Kashubian) and Baltic (Prussian Lithuanians and Curonians) minorities, and a not insignificant proportion of the population, especially in Berlin, consisted of descendants of French Huguenots. In such a heterogeneous state, the ideas of Pietism, which eventually took on the character of a "Prussian state religion", proved to be a valuable area of commonality.

When Frederick William I ascended the throne he found Prussia highly indebted, and he made order, diligence, modesty and the fear of God the guiding principles for his successful reform and reorganization of the state. He saw himself as a moral role model for his subjects. Frederick the Great, unlike his father, was an aesthete who admired Voltaire and the French Enlightenment, and was not inclined toward Pietism. He nevertheless felt himself bound to many of his father's ideals and deviated only slightly from Frederick William's self-image as the "first sergeant to the King of Prussia", saying that he wished to be the "first servant of his state". He regarded the Enlightenment ideals of reason and tolerance as personal maxims of conduct in his governance of Prussia.

Through Frederick William and his son, the values of Pietism were combined with those of the Enlightenment. They gave Prussia a progressive legal system and administration, an officer corps loyal to the crown, and a "patriotism of reason" that promoted its rise from the baroque state of the Great Elector Frederick William (r. 1640–1688) to a modern European power. The change came about in spite of Prussia's economically meager resources – it had suffered great devastation and depopulation during the Thirty Years' War (1618–1648) and had sandy, poorly arable soils that led it to be called "the blotting-sand box of the Holy Roman Empire".

The Prussian Reform Movement, which began after Prussia's 1806 defeat by Napoleon in the Battle of Jena–Auerstedt and lasted until the Congress of Vienna in 1815, also had a strong influence on the kingdom's later development. The reforms affected municipalities, the army, schools, universities and taxes and included the 1812 Edict of Emancipation that, with a few restrictions, granted Prussian Jews the same rights and duties as other citizens. The reform of the army was particularly important for the development of Prussian values by permanently changing the relationship between king and soldier and "turning the uniform jacket into a cloak of honor". It is possible that the new leadership principle of mission-type tactics based on a willingness to assume responsibility, which was developed after the 1813 wars of liberation against Napoleon but had precursors going back to Frederick the Great, also grew out of the ideals that created the Prussian symbiosis of Pietism and the Enlightenment.

The Prussian virtues are summed up in the first lines of Ludwig Hölty's poem  ("The Old Farmer to His Son"). The poem begins, "Practice always faithfulness and honesty / To your cold grave / And do not deviate a finger's breadth / From God's ways."

The virtues 

The Prussian virtues are not fixed in number or quality and therefore do not form a canon. With the exception of obedience, they all go back to the Christian cardinal virtues (generally prudence, justice, fortitude and temperance).

Virtues with predominantly military significance 
Prussian virtues originally applied just to the army and were adopted only later by a Prussian society that was increasingly oriented around the military. A strict hierarchy was characteristic of the Prussian social system, with the result that characteristics to be striven for included loyalty, a self-denial that benefits the state and the king (the Prussian soldier's oath of allegiance included the line, "He who swears by the Prussian flag no longer has anything that belongs to himself"), bravery without self-pity ("Learn to suffer without complaining"), subordination, courage, and obedience (but not without openness. (Self-)discipline, an indispensable military virtue, involved toughness towards oneself even more than towards others.

Virtues of overall social significance 
 Sincerity
 Modesty
 Honesty
 Diligence
 Straightforwardness
 Sense of justice:  = to each his own / his due, the motto of the Prussian Order of the Black Eagle
 Conscientiousness
 Willingness to make sacrifices
 Sense of order
 Sense of duty
 Punctuality
 Probity
 Cleanliness
 Frugality
 Tolerance
 Incorruptibility
 Restraint / self-effacement:   ("To be more than to appear")
 Determination
 Reliability

It is to these virtues that the obsolete saying that someone does something  ("for the King of Prussia", i.e. for free, without taking anything in return) is sometimes attributed.

Virtues of worldview 
Fear of God was considered a Prussian virtue since at least the time of Frederick William I. Under his son, too, it continued to be given high priority, although under the aspect of religious tolerance. "Everyone shall be blessed according to his own fashion" became Frederick the Great's leitmotiv. His state-sponsored cosmopolitanism also had economic reasons. When Frederick allowed Jews into the country, he obliged them to pay high special taxes.

Typical quotes 
In his novel Der Stechlin, Theodor Fontane had an officer say, "Service is everything, and dashingness is only bravado. [...] The truly noble obey not a ruler but a sense of duty. What is incumbent upon us is not the pleasure of life, not even love, real love, but only duty. This is moreover something specifically Prussian. We are distinguished by it above other nations, and even among those who do not understand it and wish us ill, the idea dawns that our superiority arises from it."

The inscription on the headstone of General Johann Friedrich Adolf von der Marwitz, who refused Frederick the Great's order to sack Hubertusburg Castle during the Seven Years' War reads: "He chose disgrace where obedience did not bring honor".

French proverb: . ("To be Prussian is an honor but not a pleasure.")

Criticism 
Prussian virtues were criticized from the beginning, as for example among the bourgeoisie, because of their remoteness from science and art, their hostility to democracy, and their state-controlled and militaristic characteristics – "command and obedience". The labor movement turned against the latter two traits in particular. During the 1960s protests, because loyalty and obedience toward the National Socialist government had been so prevalent among the German people, they were viewed with extreme suspicion and devalued as "secondary virtues" compared to the emancipatory "primary virtues".

In his 1919 Preußentum und Sozialismus, the philosopher of history Oswald Spengler judged Prussianism to be the basis of a specifically German, essentially illiberal, anti-democratic and anti-revolutionary socialist school of thought: "The German, or more precisely Prussian instinct was: power belongs to the whole. The individual serves it. The whole is sovereign. The king is only the first servant of his state (Frederick the Great). Everyone has his place. He is commanded and he obeys."

The American Richard Rhodes saw Heinrich Himmler's principle of Prussian "toughness" as a prerequisite for hundreds of thousands of Germans to willingly carry out the extermination of Jews:Himmler strove to make the repulsive task of slaughtering unarmed civilians part of the SS aura. In his efforts he was able to draw on the Prussian military tradition, according to which morally reprehensible and psychologically stressful experiences were transformed into a virtue: toughness.

Himmler also invoked the virtue of toughness in the fall of 1940 when he told SS officers that the SS had to remove hundreds of thousands of Poles in Poland in minus 40°C weather and "have the toughness" to shoot thousands of leading Poles.

"It must always be the case that such an execution has to be the hardest thing for our men. And they must never become soft, but go about it with their teeth clenched."
Since Germany's defeat in World War II and the Allied denazification campaign, historical German militarism has become anathema in German culture, which is focused on collective responsibility and Vergangenheitsbewältigung ("overcoming the past"). At the same time, the related non-military, bourgeois virtues of efficiency, discipline and work remain in high standing. This has led to the concept of "Prussian virtues" being regarded with mixed feelings in modern-day Germany. Among the German student protests of 1968, militarist virtues were rejected as prerequisites for the atrocities committed by the Nazi regime. The term Kadavergehorsam (lit. "corpse obedience") for "blind obedience", originally a slur directed against Jesuits during the 1870s Kulturkampf, came to be used as a staple derogatory against the Prussian military ethos. Similarly, the term Nibelungentreue ("Nibelung loyalty"), which in the German Empire had been used in a positive sense for the military virtue of absolute loyalty, came to be used derogatorily in reference to the fanatical loyalty characteristic of fascism. In 1982, amid the controversy surrounding the NATO Double-Track Decision, in response to Social Democratic Party of Germany (SPD) Chancellor Helmut Schmidt's call for a return to such virtues, Saarbrücken's SPD mayor Oskar Lafontaine commented that they were "perfectly suited to run a concentration camp". In 2006 the Minister President of Brandenburg Matthias Platzeck called for a return to Prussian virtues, citing "good basic virtues, such as honesty, reliability, and diligence".

See also
Virtue
Protestant work ethic
Prussian Army
Stoicism
Furor Teutonicus
Law of Jante
Imperial German influence on Republican Chile

References

External links
www.Preussen.org
www.Preussen.de: Ministerpräsident Platzeck: "Der Umgang mit dem preussischen Erbe in Brandenburg"
  This 37 second recording is the only one known to exist of the original carillon of the Potsdam Garrison Church. It is playing Mozart's melody for "Üb' immer Treu und Redlichkeit" by Ludwig Christoph Heinrich Hölty (1748–1776).

Virtue
Virtues
Military of Prussia
Prussian Army
Codes of conduct